Toyaka Sanganna  was an Indian politician. He was elected to the Lok Sabha, lower house of the Parliament of India  as a member of the Indian National Congress.

References

External links
Official Biographical Sketch in Lok Sabha Website

Lok Sabha members from Odisha
India MPs 1957–1962
India MPs 1952–1957